Śrēṣṭha is a Nepalese surname meaning "noble” or "great” in Sanskrit. Shrestha is one of the eponym surnames used by those belonging to the caste of Shresthas who prior to the unification of modern Nepal formed the ruling and administrative Kshatriya castes in the court of the Malla kings of Nepal. They also counted among them the trading and business Vaishya castes, and were the pre-eminent traders in between Nepal and Tibet. After the unification of Nepal, Shresthas took up business and trading since their former positions as administrators and courtiers of the royal Malla court was supplanted by the invading Gorkha forces mainly of the Khas tribe.

Language, Culture and Religion 

The word "Shrestha" was derived from Sanskrit term Shista meaning 'noble' or 'decent'. "Syasya" also means 'warrior' in Nepal Bhasa. Shresthas (or Syasya) served as administrators and courtiers during the rule of the Malla Newar kings that ruled Nepal for six hundred years  – known as the "Golden Era" of Nepal – when much of the cultural and architectural development of Nepal took place. They took a prominent role in the governance and administration of the nation and  fought against the Gorkha invasion. They also bravely contributed to protect their country Nepal from external powers like the Mughal.

Notable people

Politics and civil administration 
Ganga Lal Shrestha – Politician, One of the four famous Martyr of Nepal
Gopal Man Shrestha – Politician, Deputy Prime Minister 2017-18
Krishna Mohan Shrestha –  First Inspector General of Armed Police Force (Nepal)
Marich Man Singh Shrestha – Prime Minister of Nepal, 1986–90
Narayan Kaji Shrestha – Politician, Deputy Prime Minister, 2011–12
Krishna Kumar Shrestha –  Politician, Member of the House of Representatives

Arts, literature and culture 

Siddhicharan Shrestha – "Yuga Kavi", one of the most prominent literary figures of Nepal
Rakesh Shrestha – Celebrity Photographer in India 
Durga Lal Shrestha – Poet, lyricist
Ganesh Lal Shrestha – Poet, lyricist
Jagat Lal Shrestha – Educator, author
Madan Krishna Shrestha – Comedian, actor, singer
Shiva Shrestha – Actor
Shree Krishna Shrestha – Actor
Namrata Shrestha – Actress, model
Sushma Shrestha – known by stage name "Poornima", Bollywood singer
Sadichha Shrestha – Miss Nepal 2010
Shristi Shrestha – Miss Nepal World 2012
Ishani Shrestha – Miss Nepal World 2013
Asmi Shrestha – Miss Nepal World 2016
Anushka Shrestha – Miss Nepal World 2019

Others
Nani Kaji Shrestha, also known as Bauddha Rishi Mahapragya, well known  in the revival of Nepali Theravada Buddhism in the 1920s
Bishnu Shrestha – Nepali soldier in Indian Army
Purnima Shrestha, Nepalese mountaineer and photojournalist

References

Newar
Newar caste system
People from Kathmandu
Social groups of Nepal
Newari-language surnames
Surnames of Nepalese origin